"Fabulous" is a song by American singer Jaheim, featuring guest vocals by Tha' Rayne. It served as the first single from his second studio album Still Ghetto (2002). It was produced by KayGee and Eddie Berkeley, containing a sample from "Wake Up Everybody" by Harold Melvin and the Blue Notes. "Fabulous" peaked at number seven on the US Billboard Hot R&B/Hip-Hop Singles & Tracks chart, also reaching number 28 on the Billboard Hot 100, as well as number one on the Adult R&B Songs for three weeks from February 1, 2003 to February 22, 2003. An accompanying music video for was shot in August 2002 in New Jersey and includes appearances by Mary J. Blige and Tha' Rayne.

Remix
The official remix of the song, "Fabulous (The Diplomat Remix)", was released to radio in December 2002, featuring Dipset rappers Cam'Ron and Juelz Santana and R&B group Tha' Rayne. A CD single with the remix was released in the UK on February 24, 2003, and peaked at number 41 on the Singles Charts. Juelz Santana was uncredited on his part of the remix.

Track listing 

12" Single (February 24, 2003) – UK release
"Fabulous" (clean)
"Fabulous" (instrumental)
"Fabulous" (remix feat. Cam'ron, Juelz Santana, & Tha' Rayne (clean))
"Fabulous" (remix feat. Cam'ron, Juelz Santana, & Tha' Rayne (dirty))

CD Single (February 24, 2003) – UK release
"Fabulous" (clean)
"Fabulous" (instrumental)
"Fabulous" (remix feat. Cam'ron, Juelz Santana, & Tha' Rayne (clean))
"Fabulous" (remix feat. Cam'ron, Juelz Santana, & Tha' Rayne (dirty))

Charts

References 

2002 singles
Jaheim songs
Tha' Rayne songs
Music videos directed by Darren Grant
Songs written by Gene McFadden
Songs written by John Whitehead (singer)
Songs written by Balewa Muhammad
Songs written by KayGee